Norman Leslie Baker (October 14, 1863 – February 20, 1949) was a professional baseball pitcher. He pitched all or part of three seasons in Major League Baseball: 1883 for the Pittsburgh Alleghenys, 1885 for the Louisville Colonels, and 1890 for the Baltimore Orioles.

External links

Major League Baseball pitchers
Pittsburgh Alleghenys players
Louisville Colonels players
Baltimore Orioles (AA) players
Johnstown (minor league baseball) players
Springfield (minor league baseball) players
Oil City (minor league baseball) players
Nashville Americans players
Rochester Maroons players
Toronto Canucks players
Stockton (minor league baseball) players
Newark Trunkmakers players
Newark Little Giants players
Baltimore Orioles (Atlantic Association) players
Omaha Lambs players
Minneapolis Minnies players
Minneapolis Millers (baseball) players
Baseball players from Pennsylvania
1863 births
1949 deaths
19th-century baseball players